Tomasz Mendrek (born 9 August 1968) is a Czech badminton player. He competed in the men's singles tournament at the 1992 Summer Olympics.

References

External links
 

1968 births
Living people
Czech male badminton players
Olympic badminton players of Czechoslovakia
Badminton players at the 1992 Summer Olympics
People from Český Těšín
Sportspeople from the Moravian-Silesian Region